XEJB-FM (96.3 FM) is an FM radio station in Guadalajara, Jalisco, Mexico. Broadcasting from a transmitter located atop Cerro del Cuatro, XEJB-FM is owned by the government of Jalisco and carries a cultural radio format under the name Jalisco Radio.

XEJB-FM is simulcast in Ciudad Guzmán on XHCGJ-FM 107.1 (3.2 kWs ERP).

History
XEJB-FM was Jalisco's first public FM radio station. It came on air in February 1960 as a simulcast of XEJB-AM 630, and like several other stations in the 1960s, it broadcast on an even-decimal FM frequency, 96.4 MHz. It later moved to 96.3.

References

Public radio in Mexico
Radio stations in Guadalajara